The Tiguex War was the first named war between Europeans and Native Americans in what is now part of the United States. The war took place in New Spain, during the colonization of Nuevo México. It was fought in the winter of 1540-41 by the expedition of Francisco Vázquez de Coronado against the twelve or thirteen Pueblos of what would become the Tiguex Province of Nuevo México. These villages were along both sides of the Rio Grande, north and south of present-day Bernalillo, New Mexico.

Background 

Estevanico had arrived as a scout for Spanish expedition, but he went missing (assumed killed) near Hawikuh. Reports of this by Sonoran Native Mexicans frightened later Spanish expeditionary forces that went into the region. They were seeking the Seven Cities of Gold.

Due to this the Coronado expedition was large, at about 350 Spaniard men-at-arms, a large number of spouses, slaves, and servants, and as many as 2,000 Mexican Indian allies, mostly warriors from  Aztec, Purépecha, and other tribes from central and western Mexico. The expedition also brought thousands of livestock, including horses, mules, sheep, cattle, and perhaps pigs.

As soon as Coronado entered present-day New Mexico, he set up camp Zuni pueblo of Hawikuh, also known as Hawikku, Cíbola, or Cibola. He was visited there soon after by a delegation from Pecos Pueblo (now Pecos National Historical Park). One of the leaders of this delegation, after exchanging gifts, offered to guide the expedition to Pecos and the buffalo herds of the Great Plains. He had a mustache, which was unusual for a Native American, and so the Spaniards called him Bigotes (Spanish for "mustaches"). Coronado sent Hernando de Alvarado as commander for the journey.

Alvarado's reconnaissance
Alvarado was one of 200 soldiers who had used their bodies to protect the fallen Coronado at the battle of Hawikuh, saving him from being bludgeoned to death by stones dropped by the Zuni defenders. Bigotes guided Alvarado and twenty-three other Spaniards and an unknown number of Mexican Indian allies east, past Acoma and into the Rio Grande valley. There they found a cluster of Tiwa pueblos they called the province of Tiguex, named after the occupying Tiwa Puebloans.

They then traveled north along the river as far as Taos, claiming for Spain the land of several pueblos along the way.  They finally arrived at Bigotes's community of Pecos. This was the easternmost of the pueblos with a well-developed commerce with the plains Indians. Alvarado journeyed another five days easterly to see the vast buffalo herds that Bigotes had earlier described to Coronado. He returned to Tiguex at about the same time an advance party led by Field Master García López de Cárdenas also arrived.

The Tiguex Province was described as the most prosperous area the expeditions had seen, with the Rio Grande flowing through a wide, level, desert with vast irrigated cornfields. Alvarado notified Coronado that the expedition should move there for the oncoming winter.

War

Ghufoor campsite
To establish a headquarters, Cárdenas set up camp at one of the largest of the Tiguex pueblos, Ghufoor (also called Coofor or Alcanfor).

Coronado used Ghufoor as a military base from which to gain supplies from the Northern Tiwa speaking Puebloans. The expedition traded beads and trinkets for food and clothing for their winters in Ghufoor from the Tiguex pueblos at first. Due to a harsh winter, provisions became scarce for the Pueblo, so they resisted further trades. The expedition's men and livestock still continued to consume much of the post-harvest cornstalks normally used by the Puebloans for cooking and heating fuel during the winters.

Retaliation by the Puebloans
Xauían from Ghufoor usually referred to in the chronicles by the Spanish nickname of Juan Alemán, had established a bartering deal with the Spanish but opposed the Europeans after they became hostile.

In December 1540, Tiwans retaliated for the abuses by killing 40 to 60 of the expedition's free-roaming horses and mules. Spanish tactics were to react to any provocation with immediate retaliation.

Arenal and Moho

Coronado sent Cárdenas with a large force of Mexican Indian allies to conquer a Tiwa pueblo the Spaniards called Arenal. All of Arenal's defenders were killed, including an estimated 30 Tiwas who the Spaniards burned alive at the stake. The Tiwas abandoned their riverside pueblos and made their last stand in a mesa-top stronghold the Spaniards called Moho. There may have been a second mesa-top stronghold as well, but Spanish accounts differ on its existence.

Coronado was not able to conquer the stronghold by force, so he laid siege to Moho for about 80 days in January–March 1541. Finally, Moho's defenders ran out of water and attempted to escape in the night. The Tiguex War ended in a slaughter when Spaniards heard the escapees and killed almost all the men and several women.

Aftermath 

Coronado then set off on his 1541 foray across the Great Plains to central Kansas in search of the chimerical riches of Quivira.  Upon his return, the Towa Indians of Jemez Pueblo had decided the Spaniards were enemies and turned hostile, resulting in a battle and siege against Pecos.

The Tiwas had abandoned all Pueblos until the expedition left for Kansas, at which point they reoccupied them, but later abandoned them in favor of larger singular Pueblos. Coronado withdrew back to Mexico in April 1542, and the Spaniards would not return for 39 years.

Legacy 
By the time of the next Spanish expedition led by Juan de Oñate in 1598, the Pueblo people in the Tiguex Province had reestablished themselves. But the underlying hostility eventually resurfaced in the 1680 Pueblo Revolt.

It wasn't until 1706 when La Villa de Alburquerque was established as an actual trade outpost for the Pueblos, that Native rights were finally being given thought. By the mid-1700s, Native American rights to their land were being recognized by the Santa Fe de Nuevo México government, by then governor Tomás Vélez Cachupín.

The cities of Cibola of that time, have since become the modern Southern Tiwa Sandia Pueblo and Isleta Pueblo, and Keres Santa Ana Pueblo.

Popular culture
The only book-length treatment of the Tiguex War is in the historical novel, Winter of the Metal People (2013).

References

Tiwa Puebloans
Native American history of New Mexico
1540 in New Spain
Conflicts in 1540
C